A list of films produced in the Philippines in Filipino and in English. For an A-Z see :Category:Philippine films.

Pre-1940s

1940s

1950s

1960s

1970s

1980s

1990s

2000s

2010s

2020s

See also
List of years in the Philippines
List of years in Philippine television

External links
 Filipino film at the Internet Movie Database

 
Incomplete film lists